Daphnella bartschi is a species of sea snail, a marine gastropod mollusk in the family Raphitomidae.

Description
The length of the shell attains 10 mm, its diameter 5 mm.

(Original description) The small, slender shell is yellowish white with brown flames and flecks. The whorls are moderately convex. The suture is distinct. The shell contains six whorls, with a very minute brown protoconch of two whorls. The whole surface is delicately reticulated with subequal axial and spiral threads, the spirals cut by the axial interspaces into minute nodules, the interstices squarish. The surface resulting is grating to the touch. The aperture is narrow.  The siphonal canal is  hardly differentiated and not recurved.

Distribution
This marine species occurs off Baja California, Mexico, and the Galapagos Islands

References

 W. P. Woodring. 1970. Geology and paleontology of canal zone and adjoining parts of Panama: Description of Tertiary mollusks (gastropods: Eulimidae, Marginellidae to Helminthoglyptidae). United States Geological Survey Professional Paper 306(D):299–452
 Lyons, William G. "New Turridae (Gastropoda: Toxoglossa) from south Florida and the eastern Gulf of Mexico." The Nautilus 86.1 (1972): 3-7.

External links
 

bartschi
Gastropods described in 1919